is a 1993 Japanese Super Famicom video game.

Gameplay
Mazinger Z was a vertical shoot 'em up with three selectable characters : Mazinger Z, Great Mazinger and Grendizer.

Release 
The game was released on June 25, 1993.

Reception
Next Generation reviewed the arcade version of the game, rating it three stars out of five, and stated that "For those Shogun Warrior fans, this game is fantastic, for everyone else, it's OK." Famitsu gave it a score of 17 out of 40.

References

1993 video games
Bandai games
Japan-exclusive video games
Platform games
Science fiction video games
Side-scrolling video games
Single-player video games
Super Nintendo Entertainment System games
Super Nintendo Entertainment System-only games
Video games about mecha
Video games based on anime and manga
Video games developed in Japan
Winkysoft games